Dhading 2 is one of two parliamentary constituencies of Dhading District in Nepal. This constituency came into existence on the Constituency Delimitation Commission (CDC) report submitted on 31 August 2017.

Incorporated areas 
Dhading 2 parliamentary constituency incorporates Rubi Valley Rural Municipality, Khaniyabash Rural Municipality, Gangajamuna Rural Municipality, Tripura Sundari Rural Municipality, Netrawati Rural Municipality, Nilkantha Municipality and Jwalamukhi Municipality.

Assembly segments 
It encompasses the following Bagmati Provincial Assembly segment

 Dhading 2(A)
 Dhading 2(B)

Members of Parliament

Parliament/Constituent Assembly

Provincial Assembly

2(A)

2(B)

Election results

Election in the 2020s

2022 general election

Election in the 2010s

2017 legislative elections

2017 Nepalese provincial elections

Dhading 2(A)

Dhading 2(B)

2013 Constituent Assembly election

Election in the 2000s

2008 Constituent Assembly election

Election in the 1990s

1999 legislative elections

1994 legislative elections

1991 legislative elections

See also 

 List of parliamentary constituencies of Nepal

References

External links 

 Constituency map of Dhading

Parliamentary constituencies of Nepal